The BAWA Athlete of the Year is an award presented by the British Athletics Writers' Association (BAWA) to the British athletes voted to have been adjudged to have been best of the year in British athletics.

They are presented each autumn at the Association's annual awards which have been running since 1963.

There are male and female award categories for senior, junior and Paralympic athletes. The most frequent winner of the main award is Mo Farah.

Winners

Senior Awards 
The awards began in 1963. In 2011, the senior awards were renamed in honour of two highly esteemed BAWA members, the John Rodda Award for men and the Cliff Temple Award for women.

Junior Awards 
In 2011, the junior athlete awards were also renamed to the Jim Coote Memorial Award for junior men and the Lilian Board Memorial Award for junior women.

Para Awards
The Paralympic Athlete of the Year categories were introduced by British Athletics Writers in 2013, following the success of the 2012 Paralympic Games in London.

Other Awards 
The Ron Pickering Award is awarded for services to athletics. Introduced in 2011, the BAWA Inspiration Award is given in recognition of an athlete who made an outstanding performance in a single event, performed well against the odds, or is retiring after a long and distinguished career.

Notes

References 

British sports trophies and awards
Sports trophies and awards
Sport of athletics awards
Disabled sports awards
Awards established in 1963
1963 establishments in the United Kingdom